Engcongolweni is a village about  North-West of Mzuzu along the M1, in the Mzimba district of Malawi.

Populated places in Northern Region, Malawi